Isabella mac William (born  1165) (Gaelic: Isibéal nic Uilliam) was the illegitimate daughter of William the Lion King of Scots by a daughter of Robert Avenel. She married Robert III de Brus in 1183. They had no children. After his death in 1191, Isabella was married to Robert de Ros, Baron Ros of Wark (died 1227). They had the following children:

 Sir William de Ros (b. before 1200 – d. ca. 1264/1265).
 Sir Robert de Ros (ca. 1223 – 13 May 1285), was Chief Justice of the Kings Bench. He married Christian Bertram.
 Sir Alexander de Ros (d. ca. 1306), who fathered one child, William, with an unknown wife.
 Peter de Ros.

References

1160s births
Year of death unknown
12th-century Scottish people
12th-century Scottish women
Illegitimate children of Scottish monarchs
De Ros family
House of Dunkeld
House of Bruce
Daughters of kings